John Ruan may refer to:

John Ruan (businessman) (1914–2010), founder of Ruan Companies and contributor to the World Food Prize
John Ruan (politician) (1813–1892), member of the Wisconsin State Assembly